Dungate is a village near the M2 motorway, in the Swale district, in the English county of Kent. It is near the town of Sittingbourne.

References 
 A-Z Great Britain Road Atlas (page 40)

Villages in Kent
Borough of Swale